Trichiotinus assimilis, known generally as the hairy flower scarab or flower chafer, is a species of scarab beetle in the family Scarabaeidae. It is found in North America.

References

Further reading

External links

 

Cetoniinae
Articles created by Qbugbot
Beetles described in 1837